Marshall Pickering  was formed in 1981 from two long established Christian publishers.  Marshall Morgan and Scott, a London-based predominantly Baptist publishing house, which had acquired a number of publishing companies over the years, such as Bagsters (Bible publishers since 1794) and Oliphants.  Pickering and Inglis was a long established Glasgow based publisher, publishing largely for the non conformist church in Scotland with many Brethren publications. Marshall Pickering was acquired by Zondervan in 1983.

Zondervan was bought by Harper & Row in 1988. In 1989, Collins was bought by Rupert Murdoch's News Corporation, and the publisher was combined with Harper & Row, which NewsCorp had acquired two years earlier, to form HarperCollins. Marshall Pickering was merged into Zondervan in 2001.

References

Book publishing companies of the United Kingdom
News Corporation subsidiaries
Companies established in 1981